Soile Marja Isokoski (born 14 February 1957) is a Finnish lyric soprano. She is an opera singer as well as a concert and lieder singer.

Career 

Isokoski was born in Posio, Finland. She graduated from the Sibelius Academy in Helsinki (a cantor-organist diploma, a singing teacher's degree and a singing diploma) and made her concert debut there in 1986.

Isokoski won the Lappeenranta song competition in Finland (1987), the Elly Ameling Competition in the Netherlands (1988), and the Tokyo International Singing Competition (1990). In 1987 she was a finalist in the BBC Singer of the World competition in Cardiff.

She worked first as a church musician in Northern Finland. In 1987 she was engaged as a soloist with the Finnish National Opera and stayed there until 1994. Her first appearance there was as Mimi in Puccini's La bohème in 1987.

Isokoski has sung at all the leading opera houses in Europe, including the Vienna State Opera, Théâtre du Châtelet, Opéra Bastille, La Scala, Deutsche Oper Berlin, Berlin State Opera, Semperoper, the Hamburg State Opera, and the Cologne Opera.

She made her début at the Metropolitan Opera as the Countess in The Marriage of Figaro in 2002. The New York Times wrote on 28 January 2002: "Ms. Isokoski... touched on the Countess' sense of abandonment by the Count without diminishing her regal bearing or the graceful humor she must contribute to the second act. And her dark, burnished soprano should make her a good addition to the Met roster."

In 2007 Isokoski made her San Francisco Opera debut portraying the role of the Marschallin in Der Rosenkavalier. In 2010 she made her Los Angeles Opera debut as Elsa in Lohengrin.

She has also appeared at many festivals such as Salzburg Festival, Edinburgh International Festival, Chorégies d'Orange, The Proms in London, Tanglewood Music Festival and Savonlinna Opera Festival.

Isokoski's song repertoire is extensive. She has given recitals with her regular accompanist Marita Viitasalo all over the world, including in New York, Washington, D.C., Fort Lauderdale, Vienna, London, Paris, Amsterdam, Berlin, Munich, Rome, Athens, Moscow, St. Petersburg, and Tokyo.

Isokoski has appeared with many renowned conductors including Claudio Abbado, Vladimir Ashkenazy, Daniel Barenboim, James Conlon, Andrew Davis, Colin Davis, John Eliot Gardiner, Daniele Gatti, Valery Gergiev, Bernard Haitink, Marek Janowski, Neeme Järvi, Okko Kamu, James Levine, Zubin Mehta, Yehudi Menuhin, Riccardo Muti, Sakari Oramo, Seiji Ozawa, Simon Rattle, Esa-Pekka Salonen, Jukka-Pekka Saraste, Leif Segerstam, and Osmo Vänskä.

Roles 

 Così fan tutte "Fiordiligi" (Mozart)
 Don Giovanni "Donna Elvira" (Mozart)
 The Marriage of Figaro "Countess " (Mozart) 
 The Magic Flute "Pamina " (Mozart)
 Otello "Desdemona" (Verdi)
 Falstaff "Alice Ford" (Verdi) 
 Simon Boccanegra "Amelia" (Verdi)
 Die Meistersinger von Nürnberg  "Eva" (Wagner)
 Lohengrin "Elsa" (Wagner)
 Der Freischütz "Agathe" (Weber)
 The Bartered Bride "Marenka " (Smetana)
 Der Rosenkavalier "Marschallin" (Richard Strauss) 
 Capriccio "Countess" (Richard Strauss) 
 Ariadne auf Naxos "Ariadne" (Richard Strauss)
 Daphne "Daphne" (Richard Strauss)
 The Tales of Hoffmann "Antonia" (Offenbach) 
 Faust "Marguerite" (Gounod)
 La Juive "Rachel" (Halévy)
 La bohème "Mimi" (Puccini)
 Turandot "Liù" (Puccini)
 Carmen "Micaëla" (Bizet)
 Eugene Onegin "Tatjana" (Tchaikovsky)
 Peter Grimes "Ellen Orford" (Britten)
 Dialogues of the Carmelites "Madame Lidoine" (Poulenc)

Recordings

CD

 Christmas Carols Finlandia Records 1989
 Schubert: Lieder Finlandia 1994
 Schumann : Liederkreis Op. 39, Frauenliebe und –leben Finlandia 1995
 My World of Songs, Schubert, Schumann, Sibelius, Grieg & al. Finlandia 1999
 Finnish Songs Ondine 2000
 R. Strauss: Orchestral Songs Ondine 2002
 Wolf: Italienisches Liederbuch with Bo Skovhus Ondine 2002
 Artist Portrait Schubert, Schumann, Grieg, Sibelius Warner Classics 2002
 Finnish sacred Songs Ondine 2003
 Mozart: Arias Ondine 2004
 Hymns in Finnish Ondine 2005
 Sibelius: Luonnotar, Orchestral Songs Ondine 2006
 Songs by Sibelius, Strauss and Berg Wigmore Hall Live A BBC Recording 2006
 Christmas Carols with YL Male Voice Choir Ondine 2006
 Scene d'amore: Scenes and arias by Tchaikovsky, Bizet, Gounod, Puccini, Verdi Ondine 2008
 Hindemith: Das Marienleben Ondine 2009
 Richard Strauss: Lieder Ondine 2011
 Richard Strauss: Three Hymns, Opera arias Ondine 2012
 Oi jouluyö, Christmas Carols Ondine 2014
 Chausson: Poème de l'amour et de la mer, Berlioz: Les nuits d'été, Duparc: Songs Ondine 2015

Rautavaara: Cantos, Die Liebenden etc. Finlandia 1989
Mendelssohn: Elias, op. 70 Harmonia Mundi 1993
Mahler: Symphonie 4 Symphonie für Sopran und Orcheste 1993
Mozart: Così fan tutte Accent 1993
Mendelssohn: Paulus, op. 36 Opus III 1995
Sibelius: Kullervo Op 7 Chandos 1995
Gothoni: Der Ochs und sein Hirte Ondine 1995
Fux: La deposizione dalla croce Novalis 1995
Schubert: Messe Es-dur D 959 Berlin Classics 1996
Kokkonen: Requiem BIS 1996
Sibelius: Finlandia / Luonnotar etc. Deutsche Grammophon 1996
Mahler: Symphonie 2 in C minor Fonit Cetra Records 1997
Schubert: Die Verschworenen Opus III 1997
Brahms: Ein Deutsches Requiem, Op.45 Opus III 1997
Zemlinsky: Der Zwerg EMI 1997
Mozart: Don Giovanni Deutsche Grammophon 1998
Schubert: Missa Solemnis, Stabat Mater, Salve Regina Ondine 1999
Mendelssohn: "Lobgesang" Eine Symphonie Cantate No. 2 Opus III 2000
Beethoven: Fidelio 2000
Beethoven: Symphonie No 9 Teldec 2000
Sibelius: Conferment and Coronation Cantatas etc. Ondine 2000
Zemlinsky: Sämtliche Orchesterlieder EMI 2000
Live from the Kuhmo Festival, A Century of Finnish Chamber Music Ondine 2002
Zemlinsky: Lyrische Symphonie EMI 2002
Halévy: La Juive RCA 2002
Pacius: Die Loreley BIS 2003 
Graun: Der Tod Jesu Querstand 2004 
Nielsen: Complete Symphonies Deutsche Grammophon 2005
Mahler: Symphony No. 8 EMI 2005
Wiener Opernfest 2005 Orfeo 2005
13. Festliche Operngala für die Deutsche AIDS-Stiftung Sony BMG 2007
Sibelius: Kullervo Ondine 2008
 Schönberg: Gurrelieder Signum 2009
 Gounod: Faust Orfeo 2010

DVD

 Vienna State Opera gala concert – 50th anniversary of the reopening Live: Vienna, 5 November 2005
 13. Festliche Operngala für die AIDS-Stiftung. Live-Aufnahme aus der Deutschen Oper Berlin vom 11. November 2006
 Ioan Holender Farewell Concert: Live From the Vienna State Opera 2010
 Poulenc: Dialogues des Carmélites BelAir Classiques 2011

Awards and recognitions

 1st prize in the Lappeenranta song competition 1987
 BBC Singer of the World competition 1987 finalist
 1st prize in the Elly Ameling Competition 1988
 1st prize in the Tokyo International Singing Competition 1990
 The Pro Finlandia medal in honour of her notable contribution to Finnish music 2002
 Gramophone Editors's Choice Award, Four Last Songs of Richard Strauss (Ondine) 2002
 The State Prize for Music 2005
 Gramophone Award nomination for Songs by Sibelius, Strauss and Berg 2006
 MIDEM Classical Award, Sibelius: Luonnotar Orchestral Songs (Ondine) 2007
 BBC Music Magazine Award, Disc of the Year and Vocal Award, Sibelius: Luonnotar Orchestral Songs (Ondine) 2007
 The Sibelius Medal of the Sibelius Society of Finland 2007
 The title of Kammersängerin in Vienna 2008
 Diapason d’Or 2008, Sibelius: Kullervo with YL Male Voice Choir, Helsinki PO/Leif Segerstam, Tommi Hakala
 Prix Caecilia 2009, Hindemith: Das Marienleben
 Honorary Doctorate from the University of Helsinki 2011

References

Sources

 Hillila, Ruth-Esther and Hong, Barbara Blanchard. 1997. Historical Dictionary of the Music and Musicians of Finland, p. 171. Greenwood Publishing Group. 
 International Who's Who in Classical Music 2003, Europa Publications.  L180
 Opera, June 2006
 Who's Who in Finland 2007, Otava 2006. 
 Concise Oxford Dictionary of Music, Oxford University Press 2007. 
Finnish Music Information Centre

External links
 Soile Isokoski at Boris Orlob Management
Ondine Records: Soile Isokoski, soprano
[ Allmusic.com: Soile Isokoski biography]
Soile Isokoski: A digital interview with the great Finnish soprano by Göran Forsling
The Mirjam Helin International Singing Competition 2009. Jury, Soile Isokoski
Interview: Soprano Soile Isokoski returns to Covent Garden for Rosenkavalier MusicalCriticism.com 25 November 2009
Finnish Music Quarterly The freedom of song

1957 births
Deutsche Grammophon artists
Living people
People from Posio
EMI Classics and Virgin Classics artists
Finnish operatic sopranos
Sibelius Academy alumni
Österreichischer Kammersänger
20th-century Finnish women opera singers
21st-century Finnish women opera singers